Milking the Stars: A Re-Imagining of Last Patrol is the tenth studio album by the American rock band Monster Magnet.  According to the band's frontman Dave Wyndorf, the album is a "reimagined" version of their previous album, 2013's Last Patrol, featuring four new songs and two live tracks.  The album is not strictly a remix of Last Patrol; songs feature new recordings and arrangements aimed at giving the album what Wyndorf describes as "a weird 1960s vibe". The album closes with two live tracks which were recorded at the AB in Brussels in 2014, and which feature the debut performance of the band's new bassist, Chris Kosnik.

The album was released on November 14, 2014 in continental Europe, November 17, 2014 in the UK, and November 18, 2014 in the US and Canada.

Track listing 
 Let the Circus Burn - 7:25
 Mindless Ones '68 - 5:22
 No Paradise for Me - 5:34
 End of Time (B-3) - 6:36
 Milking the Stars - 7:19
 Hallelujah (Fuzz and Swamp) - 5:01
 I Live Behind the Clouds (Roughed Up and Slightly Spaced) - 4:35
 Goliath Returns - 3:30
 Stay Tuned (Even Sadder) - 6:01
 The Duke (Full On Drums 'N Wah) - 5:25
 Last Patrol (live at the AB, 2014) - 11:14
 Three Kingfishers (live at the AB, 2014) - 6:41

Personnel
Dave Wyndorf – guitar, keyboards, vocals
Philip Caivano – bass, guitar
Bob Pantella –	percussion, drums
Garrett Sweeny – guitar, sitar
Chris Kosnik – bass on "Last Patrol", "Three Kingfishers"

References

Monster Magnet albums
2014 albums
Napalm Records albums